Spillover may refer to:

 Behavioral spillover, the effect that one behavior has on other behaviors with a shared motive
 Spillover: Animal Infections and the Next Human Pandemic, a 2012 book by David Quammen
 Spillover (experiment), an effect on subjects not the direct target of the experiment
 Spillover (economics), an economic event that occurs because of an event in a seemingly unrelated context
 in economics, spillover from disequilibrium in one market may influence effective demand in another market 
 Spillover of a war:
 Spillover of the Syrian Civil War
 Spillover of the Tigray War
 Spillover (imaging), in e.g. tomography, an imaging effect that exaggerates small objects, because of limited resolution 
 Spillover infection or pathogen spillover occurs when an infectious reservoir population affects a novel host 
 Spillover-crossover model, in psychology distinguishes spillover from crossover as components of transfer of well-being
 Adsorption spillover, a chemical phenomenon involving the movement of atoms adsorbed onto a metal surface 
 Knowledge spillover, exchange of ideas among individuals

See also 

 Spillover II, an artwork by Jaume Plensa
 Catalyst support#Spillover
Hydrogen spillover